Sebastián Mora Vedri (born 19 February 1988) is a Spanish track cyclist and road cyclist, who most recently rode for UCI Continental team . At the 2012 Summer Olympics, he competed in the Men's team pursuit for the national team.

Major results
2014
 1st Stage 5 Tour of Thailand
2015
 UEC European Track Championships
1st  Madison (with Albert Torres)
1st  Scratch
2016
 UCI Track World Championships
1st  Scratch
3rd  Madison (with Albert Torres) 
 1st  Madison (with Albert Torres), UEC European Track Championships
 1st Six Days of Rotterdam (with Albert Torres)
2018
 2nd  Madison (with Albert Torres), UCI Track World Championships
 5th Time trial, National Road Championships
2019
 1st  Scratch, UEC European Track Championships
 2nd  Points race, UCI Track World Championships
2020
 UCI Track World Championships
2nd  Points race
3rd  Scratch
 UEC European Track Championships
1st  Madison (with Albert Torres)
1st  Points race
2022
 3rd  Omnium, UEC European Track Championships

References

External links

Spanish male cyclists
1988 births
Living people
Olympic cyclists of Spain
Cyclists at the 2012 Summer Olympics
Cyclists at the 2020 Summer Olympics
Spanish track cyclists
People from Villarreal
Sportspeople from the Province of Castellón
Cyclists from the Valencian Community